Mount Royal is situated at the southern end of the Mount Royal Range in the Barrington Tops region of eastern Australia. It is part of the World Heritage Gondwana Rainforests of Australia.

The lower sections of the mountain are made up of sedimentary rocks such as mudstones. It originated from the flow of the nearby Barrington Volcano. The mountain is partially in Mount Royal National Park and Barrington Tops National Park.

History 
Mount Royal was first discovered and summited by Ludwig Leichhardt in 1843.

Flora 

The high altitude rainforest growing on the red/brown soils lacks the Antarctic beech despite apparently ideal conditions. Their place the upper canopy is taken by the golden sassafras. The elevated narrow rainforest features hanging moss, often covered in mist.

The mountain's summit is covered in a low rainforest thicket, composed mostly of the hill water gum. Other noteworthy plants on the mountain include New England blackbutt, chainfruit, prickly ash, grass tree and the mountain walnut. Another interesting feature of Mount Royal is the grassy balds, surrounded by temperate rainforest. Fire caused by lightning is one speculative theory of their origin.

The lower south east slopes of Mount Royal support a well developed sub-tropical rainforest. Significant species include the Australian red cedar, citronella, rosewood and the giant stinging tree.

Fauna 

A considerable variety of birds and animals are found in the area. Wedge-tailed eagles, eastern grey kangaroos and tiger snakes are common. Some of the more rare inhabitants include: the rufous scrub-bird, paradise riflebird, wompoo fruit dove, Parma wallaby, rough-scaled snake, stuttering frog, Booroolong frog and the Davies' tree frog. The Hastings River mouse was rediscovered here in the 1980s.

Gallery

See also 

 List of mountains in New South Wales

References 

Hunter Region
Forests of New South Wales
Brumlow Tops